Kopineshwar Mandir (also Kaupīnēśvar Mandir) is a temple dedicated to the Hindu god Shiva and is considered the patron god of Thane.  The Shivalinga inside the temple is considered one of the largest in Maharashtra, India.

History
The temple was built by the Shilahara dynasty. It was renovated and rebuilt in 1760. The hall in front of the garbha griha was rebuilt in 1879 by raising funds and donations. It was later again renovated in 1996. The temple was earlier on the banks of the Masunda Lake(Talao Pali) but is currently separated by the Shivaji Road which reaches to the Thane railway station. The temple has two entrances- one located opposite Masunda Lake and another inside the Jambhli Naka market.

Temple complex
The temple is located in the market area and at the entrance gates, is the Nandi (sacred bull). The principal deity temple of Shiva has a 12 feet diameter by 4'-3" feet tall Shiva Linga. The temple complex also houses shrines dedicated to Brahma, Rama, Hanuman, Shitala Devi (Thatakai), Uttareshwar (Kashi Viswalingeswar), Dattatreya, Garuda and Kali.

References

External links
 Info on the temple.

Hindu temples in Maharashtra
Buildings and structures in Thane
Shiva temples in Maharashtra